Dar Emtedade Shab (literally: Throughout the Night) is a 1977 Iranian drama film directed by Parviz Sayyad. It stars Iranian singer Googoosh and actor Saeed Kangarani.

Plot
Parvaneh (Googoosh), who is a famous singer and movie star, has an affair with Kaveh (naser Mamdouh) who has a family, after she gets divorced. A student named Baabak (Saeed Kangarani), who suffers from leukaemia, falls in love with Parvaneh and writes her letters expressing his love. They meet and have a good time together for a while. Parvaneh hears about Baabak's disease and decides to send him abroad for medical treatment.

Cast
Googoosh as Parvaneh
Saeed Kangarani as Baabak
Malihe Nazari as Baabak's mother
Naser Mamduh as Kaveh
Mahbubeh Bayat

References

1977 films
Films directed by Parviz Sayyad
1970s Persian-language films
Films about cancer
Medical-themed films
Iranian romantic drama films
1977 romantic drama films